Aliabad (also Romanized as ‘Alīābād; also known as ‘Alīābād-e ‘Abd ol Karīm) is a village in Rigestan Rural District, Zavareh District, Ardestan County, Isfahan Province, Iran. At the 2006 census, its population was 53, in 13 families.

References 

Populated places in Ardestan County